SS Demosthenes can refer to:

, a UK ocean liner built in 1911 and scrapped in 1931
, an oil tanker built in the USA in 1917, renamed Demosthenes and registered in Panama in 1948; she was scrapped in 1955

Ship names